RX5 may refer to:

Roewe RX5, a Chinese compact crossover automobile
RX5 (album), a 1981 album by The Alvin Lee Band